Johanna Asklöf (née Tiira, born 25 August 1972) is a Finnish orienteering competitor and World champion.

She received a silver medal in the relay event at the 1993 World Orienteering Championships in West Point, USA, together with Kirsi Tiira, Annika Viilo and Eija Koskivaara. She earned a silver medal with the Finnish relay team at the 1999 World Championships in Inverness, and also an individual bronze medal on the Classic distance. She won a gold medal at the 2001 World Orienteering Championships in Tampere with the Finnish relay team, and received a silver medal on the Sprint distance.

She became Junior World Champion with the Finnish relay team in 1991.

See also
 Finnish orienteers
 List of orienteers
 List of orienteering events

References

External links

1972 births
Living people
Finnish orienteers
Female orienteers
Foot orienteers
World Orienteering Championships medalists
Competitors at the 2001 World Games
Junior World Orienteering Championships medalists